The Arkansas Intercollegiate Conference (AIC) was an athletic conference in existence from 1927 or 1928 to 1995 affiliated with the National Association of Intercollegiate Athletics (NAIA). The conference membership consisted entirely of colleges and universities in the state of Arkansas.

History
Some references indicate that the league started competition in 1927 while others list a 1928 date. The league seems to have competed in baseball and basketball in 1927-28 and started football competition in 1929. Some references list football championships for 1927 and 1928 while others do not so these may have been unofficial titles that anticipated the start of the league's football competition.

In 1941, with many member institutions suffering from reduced male student populations, the AIC suspended competition in order to save gasoline and other resources necessary for the war effort. Competition was not resumed until the 1945 season.

In December 1952 the AIC schools implemented new "amateurism" rules that no scholarships or subsidies would be offered to athletes beyond those that were available to regular students. Southern Arkansas and Arkansas Tech were opposed to the new rules and did not strictly enforce them. In December 1955 several AIC schools declared that they would no longer play SAU or Tech due to unspecified violations of the rule and neither school was able to compete for titles in any sport during the 1956 and 1957 school years. This situation was finally resolved in 1959 when a compromise was reached and Southern Arkansas and Tech were "restored" to the conference.

In 1983 the conference sanctioned women's sports for the first time. Prior to this most women's teams competed in the Arkansas Women's Extramural Sports Association (AWESA) which was founded in 1965 and later renamed as the Arkansas Women's Intercollegiate Sports Association (AWISA) in 1973.

In 1993 Central Arkansas and Henderson State elected to move to the NCAA Division II Gulf South Conference and were followed by the remaining public schools in 1995 which marked the end of the conference. Two of the remaining private schools, Ouachita Baptist and Harding, were accepted into the Lone Star Conference. The other private school, John Brown University, joined the Sooner Athletic Conference as the AIC dissolved.

The New South Intercollegiate Swim Conference was formed after the dissolution to provide several of the old AIC school's swimming programs a chance to compete for championships.

Member schools

Final members

Notes

Former members

Notes

Membership timeline

Commissioners
 Heber Lowery McAlister (1948–1956)
 Cliff Shaw (1956–1971)
 Charles Mabern Adcock (1971–1974)
 Leroy Nix Jr. (1974–1978)
 Sid Simpson (1978–1979)
 Harry T. Hall (1979–1993)
 Don Cleek (1994–1995)

Football

Football champions
Shared championships are shown in italics:

Basketball

Men's basketball champions
Following are the AIC regular-season conference champions from 1928 to 1995 (showing shared championships in italics) 
NOTE: Information is incomplete.

Baseball

Baseball champions
NOTE: Information is incomplete

References

 
Sports in the Southern United States
Sports leagues established in 1928
Sports leagues disestablished in 1995
1928 establishments in Arkansas
1995 disestablishments in Arkansas